John Joseph "Jake" Caulfield (November 23, 1917 – December 16, 1986) was an American professional baseball player whose career lasted for six seasons (1943–1948), including one campaign in Major League Baseball as a shortstop for the Philadelphia Athletics.

After attending the University of San Francisco, Caulfield began his pro career during World War II at the relatively advanced age of 25 for the Oakland Oaks of the top-level Pacific Coast League, appearing in 152 games in 1943. He would be the Oaks' regular shortstop for three seasons, through 1945, until his acquisition by the Athletics for 1946.  In his lone MLB season, Caulfield appeared in 44 games, including 31 games at shortstop and one at third base. In 94 at bats, he registered 26 hits, including eight doubles, and he scored 13 runs. He was the club's third-most-used shortstop, behind Pete Suder and Jack Wallaesa.

In Charlie Metro's autobiography, this is what he wrote about the 1946 trade that brought Jake Caulfield from the Oakland Oaks to the Philadelphia Athletics: "The Athletics needed a shortstop, so they traded Charlie Gassaway, Ed Busch, and me to Oakland for Jake Caulfield, all the way across the continent in the Pacific Coast League.  After I had hit 3 home runs!  I pleaded with Mr. Mack, 'My gosh, Mr. Mack, you couldn't have sent me any farther.'  I was on my way west.  Every time I'd see Jake Caulfield, who later retired from the San Francisco police force, at spring training at Phoenix, I'd tell him, 'I'm going to punch you right now.'  He lasted only one year with the Athletics.  I said, 'If you'd quit one year sooner, I'd still have been in the big leagues.'  And we'd have a laugh over that."  

Caulfield returned to the minor leagues for his final two professional seasons at the Triple-A level, playing for the Sacramento Solons and Columbus Red Birds in 1947 and for the Rochester Red Wings and San Diego Padres in 1948.

References

External links

1917 births
1986 deaths
Baseball players from Los Angeles
Columbus Red Birds players
Major League Baseball shortstops
Oakland Oaks (baseball) players
Philadelphia Athletics players
Rochester Red Wings players
Sacramento Solons players
San Diego Padres (minor league) players
San Francisco Dons baseball players